Glyphoglossus guttulatus, also known as Burmese squat frog, blotched burrowing frog, orange burrowing frog, or striped spadefoot frog, is a species of frog in the family Microhylidae. It is found in Myanmar, Thailand, Cambodia, Laos, and Vietnam. It is uncertain whether it is present in the Peninsular Malaysia.

It is most commonly observed on leaf litter near rivers. Breeding is explosive and takes place in water. The tadpoles are suspension feeders.

This species can occur locally in great numbers during the breeding and then effectively disappear. It is probably threatened by habitat degradation caused by expansion of agricultural land, roads, and human settlements. It is harvested for human consumption in Laos and Cambodia. It has been recorded in a number of protected areas, and many more protected areas overlap with its predicted range.

References

guttulatus
Amphibians of Cambodia
Amphibians of Laos
Amphibians of Myanmar
Amphibians of Thailand
Amphibians of Vietnam
Taxa named by Edward Blyth
Amphibians described in 1856
Taxonomy articles created by Polbot